The 1999 Cracker Barrel 500 was the fourth stock car race of the 1999 NASCAR Winston Cup Series season and the 40th iteration of the event. The race was held on Sunday, March 14, 1999, in Hampton, Georgia at Atlanta Motor Speedway, a  permanent asphalt quad-oval intermediate speedway. The race took the scheduled 325 laps to complete. In the closing laps of the race, Hendrick Motorsports driver Jeff Gordon would manage to pull a sizable lead over the rest of the field to win his 44th career NASCAR Winston Cup Series victory and his second of the season. To fill out the podium, Joe Gibbs Racing driver Bobby Labonte and Roush Racing driver Mark Martin would finish second and third, respectively.

Background 

Atlanta Motor Speedway (formerly Atlanta International Raceway) is a 1.54-mile race track in Hampton, Georgia, United States, 20 miles (32 km) south of Atlanta. It has annually hosted NASCAR Winston Cup Series stock car races since its inauguration in 1960.

The venue was bought by Speedway Motorsports in 1990. In 1994, 46 condominiums were built over the northeastern side of the track. In 1997, to standardize the track with Speedway Motorsports' other two intermediate ovals, the entire track was almost completely rebuilt. The project made the track one of the fastest on the NASCAR circuit.

Entry list 

 (R) - denotes rookie driver

Practice

First practice 
The first practice session was held on Friday, March 12, at 10:00 AM EST. The session would last for two hours and 25 minutes.

Second practice 
The second practice session was held on Friday, March 12, at 12:00 PM EST. The session would last for 55 minutes.

Third practice 
The third practice session was held on Saturday, March 13, at 9:30 AM EST. The session would last for 45 minutes.

Final practice 
The final practice session, sometimes referred to as Happy Hour, was held on Saturday, March 13, after the preliminary 1999 Yellow Freight 300. The session would last for one hour.

Qualifying 
Qualifying was split into two rounds. The first round was held on Friday, March 12, at 2:30 PM EST. Each driver would have one lap to set a time. During the first round, the top 25 drivers in the round would be guaranteed a starting spot in the race. If a driver was not able to guarantee a spot in the first round, they had the option to scrub their time from the first round and try and run a faster lap time in a second round qualifying run, held on Saturday, March 13, at 11:00 AM EST. As with the first round, each driver would have one lap to set a time. Positions 26-36 would be decided on time, while positions 37-43 would be based on provisionals. Six spots are awarded by the use of provisionals based on owner's points. The seventh is awarded to a past champion who has not otherwise qualified for the race. If no past champion needs the provisional, the next team in the owner points will be awarded a provisional.

Three drivers would fail to qualify: Robert Pressley, Steve Grissom, and Morgan Shepherd.

Full qualifying results 

*Time not available.

Race results

References 

1999 NASCAR Winston Cup Series
NASCAR races at Atlanta Motor Speedway
March 1999 sports events in the United States
1999 in sports in Georgia (U.S. state)